The 2008 UIM F1 World Championship was the 25th season of Formula 1 Powerboat racing. The calendar consisted of eight events, beginning in Doha, Qatar on 29 March 2008, and ending in Sharjah, UAE on 12 December 2008. Jay Price, driving for the Qatar Team, secured the drivers' title, becoming only the second American to win the championship in its history.

Teams and drivers

Season calendar

Results and standings
Points were awarded to the top 10 classified finishers. A maximum of two boats per team were eligible for points in the teams' championship.

Drivers standings

Teams standings
Only boats with results eligible for points counting towards the teams' championship are shown here.

References

External links
 The official website of the UIM F1 H2O World Championship
 The official website of the Union Internationale Motonautique

F1 Powerboat World Championship
Formula 1 Powerboat seasons
F1 Powerboat World Championship